Cobb Town, Wisconsin is an unincorporated community in the Town of Farmington, Waupaca County, Wisconsin.

Notes

Unincorporated communities in Wisconsin
Unincorporated communities in Waupaca County, Wisconsin